Minsk Theological Academy is a university of Applied Sciences of the Belarusian Exarchate of the Russian Orthodox Church. Named after Saint Cyril of Turaw. Geographically located within the Church of the Assumption in Žyrovičy, Slonim District, Grodno Voblast.

The Academy is a private educational institution. Academy training programs meet the standards and rules set by the Education Committee of the Holy Synod of the Russian Orthodox Church. The term of study at the academy - 3 years.

In the future it is planned to transfer the Academy to Minsk.

History
In 1996, the Holy Synod of the Russian Orthodox Church, having heard the report of Metropolitan of Minsk and Slutsk, Patriarchal Exarch of all Belarus Philaret (Vakhromeyev), on the meeting of the Synod of the Belarusian Exarchate of 3 February 1996 (№ 34), "blessed the start of the Minsk Theological Academy". The first issue of the Minsk Theological Academy took place in September 1999.

Universities and colleges affiliated with the Russian Orthodox Church
Eastern Orthodoxy in Belarus